Jew Mountain is a summit in Ravalli County, Montana, in the United States.

References

Mountains of Ravalli County, Montana
Mountains of Montana